The 1976–77 Los Angeles Kings season was the Kings' tenth season in the National Hockey League.

Offseason

Regular season
The 1976–77 season was similar to the year before for the Kings. Dionne continued to lead the offense, the defense was unspectacular but solid, but it was a season of roster turnover as some aging veterans departed (e.g. Bob Nevin, Mike Corrigan) and others lost significant time to injuries (Larry Brown, Juha Widing, Sheldon Kannegiesser). Youngsters like Glen Goldup, Lorne Stamler, and Steve Clippingdale struggled although second year defenseman Gary Sargent was solid. The Kings added Dave Schultz (the "Hammer") to replace Dan Maloney who left in the Dionne trade for toughness, but it took nearly all season for the roster to jell. In addition, backup goalie Gary Edwards struggled and was eventually traded for Gary Simmons; he was not the answer either, so #1 goalie Rogie Vachon was overworked. The Kings were also stuck behind the Montreal Canadiens who finished an amazing 60–8–12; many say this was the greatest team in NHL history.

After struggling near or below the .500 mark, the Kings won 5 of their last 6 games to finish 6th overall – the same as the year before although with 2 fewer points.

Final standings

Schedule and results

Playoffs
For the second straight year, the Kings faced the Atlanta Flames in the mini series. And for the second year in a row, the Kings scored in the first minute of game 1 and won 5–2. But unlike the prior year, they lost game 2 in Atlanta 3–2, forcing a deciding game 3 back in L.A. Vachon was brilliant as the Kings took a 3–1 lead into the 3rd period. But Atlanta scored late to make it 3–2, and the issue wasn't decided until the Kings got an empty net goal for a 4–2 win.

For the second straight year, the Kings faced the Boston Bruins in the quarter finals and again were heavy underdogs. Boston dominated the first two games in Boston, winning 8–3 and 6–2. The Kings offense woke up when they returned to L.A., but the defense continued to struggle and the Kings lost 7–6 to fall behind 3 games to none. Vachon looked exhausted (he had now played 74 games) and the Kings could not cope with Boston's size advantage. But they managed to outskate Boston in a 7–4 game 4 win, but it seemed a formality to go back to Boston for game 5. It was in that game that Vachon played one of the great games in playoff history. The Kings were badly outshot but in the words of Boston goalie Gerry Cheevers, "Vachon did everything but stand on his head to make great save after great save." The Kings led 2–1 and clinched the game with an empty netter, forcing a game 6 in Los Angeles. In that game, the Kings fell behind 3–0 but battled back to tie the game in the 3rd period at 3. Then, as Kings defenseman Dave Hutchison went to clear the puck on a Boston power play, he broke his stick on the ice, turned the puck over, and Boston scored to win the game 4–3 and the series 4 games to 2.

Player statistics

Awards and records
Lady Byng Memorial Trophy – Marcel Dionne

All NHL 2nd team – Rogie Vachon, Goalie

Transactions
The Kings were involved in the following transactions during the 1976–77 season.

Trades

Free agents lost

Draft picks
Los Angeles's draft picks at the 1976 NHL Amateur Draft held in Montreal, Quebec.

Farm teams

See also
1976–77 NHL season

References

External links

Los Angeles Kings seasons
Los Angeles Kings
Los Angeles Kings
Los
Los